Maria Paudler (20 June 1903 – 17 August 1990) was an Austro-Hungarian-born German actress.

Selected filmography
 Madame Wants No Children (1926)
 The Young Man from the Ragtrade (1926)
 The Violet Eater (1926)
 One Does Not Play with Love (1926)
 Weekend Magic (1927)
 The White Spider (1927)
 The Beggar Student (1927)
 Orient Express (1927)
 The Lorelei (1927)
 The Indiscreet Woman (1927)
 Mein Freund Harry (1928)
 The Abduction of the Sabine Women (1928)
 A Girl with Temperament (1928)
 Darling of the Dragoons (1928)
 Marriage (1928)
 The Last Fort (1929)
 Love in the Snow (1929)
 Foolish Happiness (1929)
 Gentlemen Among Themselves (1929)
 Youth of the Big City (1929)
 Marriage Strike (1930)
 The Great Longing (1930)
 Two Worlds (1930)
 Johann Strauss (1931)
 The Wrong Husband (1931)
 The Young Baron Neuhaus (1934)
 Professor Nachtfalter (1951)
 Once on the Rhine (1952)
 Not Afraid of Big Animals (1953)
 A Love Story (1954)

Bibliography
 St. Pierre, Paul Matthew. E.A. Dupont and his Contribution to British Film: Varieté, Moulin Rouge, Piccadilly, Atlantic, Two Worlds, Cape Forlorn. Fairleigh Dickinson University Press, 2010

External links

1903 births
1990 deaths
Austrian emigrants to Germany
German film actresses
German silent film actresses
People from Děčín
20th-century German actresses